The Fenway Bowl is an NCAA Division I Football Bowl Subdivision college football bowl game played at Fenway Park in Boston, Massachusetts. Organized by ESPN Events and Fenway Sports Management, it features teams from the American Athletic Conference and the Atlantic Coast Conference. Upon its inaugural playing in 2022, it became the fourth active bowl game staged in a baseball stadium, along with the Pinstripe Bowl (Yankee Stadium), the Holiday Bowl (Petco Park) and Guaranteed Rate Bowl (Chase Field).

History

American football games at Fenway Park date to at least 1916. Various professional and college football teams have played at Fenway, including the Boston Patriots during the American Football League (AFL) era, and the Boston College Eagles. Prior to the Fenway Bowl, no bowl game had been scheduled for the ballpark.

Organizers had planned for the inaugural playing of the Fenway Bowl to be during the 2020–21 bowl season. On October 23, 2020, it was reported that the bowl would not debut as planned, citing COVID-19 pandemic concerns. Postponement of the bowl was confirmed by organizers the following week, with the temporary Montgomery Bowl being created as a substitute.

On May 27, 2021, organizers announced a game date for the 2021–22 bowl season of December 29, 2021. On November 4, 2021, Wasabi Technologies signed on as the title sponsor of the game. However, the game was canceled three days prior to kickoff due to COVID issues within the Virginia team; they had been set to face SMU.

On December 17, 2022, as part of the 2022–23 bowl season, the Fenway Bowl was played for the first time, featuring Cincinnati and  Louisville.

Game results

MVPs

Appearances by team
Updated through the 2022 edition (1 game, 2 total appearances).

Teams with a single appearance
Won: Louisville

Lost: Cincinnati

Appearances by conference
for the 2022 edition (1 game, 2 total appearances).

Game records

Source:

Media coverage

Television

Radio

References

External links
 

Fenway Bowl
College football bowls
Annual sporting events in the United States
American football in Boston
Sports competitions in Boston
Recurring sporting events established in 2022
2022 establishments in Massachusetts